1469 Linzia, provisional designation , is a dark asteroid from the outer regions of the asteroid belt, approximately 60 kilometers in diameter. Discovered by Karl Reinmuth at Heidelberg Observatory in 1938, the asteroid was later named after the Austrian city of Linz.

Discovery 

Linzia was discovered on 19 August 1938, by German astronomer Karl Reinmuth at the Heidelberg-Königstuhl State Observatory in southwest Germany. Twelve nights later, the asteroid was independently discovered by Soviet astronomer Grigory Neujmin at the Simeiz Observatory, Crimea, on 31 August 1938. The Minor Planet Center only recognizes the first discoverer.

Orbit and classification 

Linzia is a non-family asteroid from the main belt's background population. It orbits the Sun in the outer asteroid belt at a distance of 2.9–3.3 AU once every 5 years and 6 months (2,016 days). Its orbit has an eccentricity of 0.07 and an inclination of 13° with respect to the ecliptic.

Physical characteristics 

Linzia has been characterized as a dark and primitive P-type asteroid by the Wide-field Infrared Survey Explorer (WISE), while the Lightcurve Data Base assumes it to be a carbonaceous C-type asteroid.

Rotation period 

In September 2010, a rotational lightcurve of Linzia was obtained from photometric observations by Robert Stephens in collaboration with Vladimir Benishek. Lightcurve analysis gave a slightly longer-than average rotation period of 22.215 hours with a brightness amplitude of 0.09 magnitude. Other lightcurves which measured a period of 6.067, 12 and 15.2 hours, received a lower quality rating.

Diameter and albedo 

According to the surveys carried out by the Infrared Astronomical Satellite IRAS, the Japanese Akari satellite and the NEOWISE mission of NASA's WISE telescope, Linzia measures between 54.30 and 74.78 kilometers in diameter  and its surface has an albedo between 0.038 and 0.0734.

The Collaborative Asteroid Lightcurve Link derives an albedo of 0.0561 and a diameter of 58.78 kilometers based on an absolute magnitude of 9.9.

Naming 

This minor planet was named in honor of the Austrian city of Linz, located on the Danube river. The name Name was proposed by A. Wersig, and the official naming citation was mentioned in The Names of the Minor Planets by Paul Herget in 1955.

References

External links 
 Asteroid Lightcurve Database (LCDB), query form (info )
 Dictionary of Minor Planet Names, Google books
 Asteroids and comets rotation curves, CdR – Observatoire de Genève, Raoul Behrend
 Discovery Circumstances: Numbered Minor Planets (1)-(5000) – Minor Planet Center
 
 

001469
Discoveries by Karl Wilhelm Reinmuth
Named minor planets
19380819